Allan Hills 77005 (also known as Allan Hills A77005, ALHA77005, ALH77005 and ALH-77005) is a Martian meteorite that was found in the Allan Hills of Antarctica in 1977 by a Japanese National Institute of Polar Research mission team and ANSMET. Like other members of the group of SNCs (shergottite, nakhlite, chassignite), ALH-77005 is thought to be from Mars.

Description

Initial geological examination determined that the meteorite was composed of ~55% olivine, ~35% pyroxene, ~8% maskelynite and ~2% opaques.

In March 2019, researchers reported the possibility of biosignatures in this Martian meteorite based on its microtexture and morphology as detected with  optical microscopy and FTIR-ATR microscopy, and on the detection of mineralized organic compounds, suggesting that microbial life could have existed on the planet Mars. More broadly, and as a result of their studies, the researchers suggest Solar System materials should be carefully studied to determine whether there may be signs of microbial forms within other space rocks as well.

See also 

 Allan Hills 84001
 Glossary of meteoritics
 History of Mars observation
 Life on Mars
 List of Martian meteorites on Earth
 List of meteorites on Mars
 Nakhla meteorite
 Mars sample return mission
 Panspermia
 Shergotty meteorite
 Water on Mars

References

Further reading

External links 

 Meteoritical Society
 The British and Irish Meteorite Society
 The Natural History Museum's meteorite catalogue database

Astrobiology
Extraterrestrial life
Martian meteorites
Meteorites found in Antarctica